The St. Louis Cardinals 1997 season was the team's 116th season in St. Louis, Missouri and the 106th season in the National League.  The Cardinals went 73-89 during the season and finished 4th in the National League Central division, 11 games behind the Houston Astros.

Offseason
December 4, 1996: Willie McGee was signed as a free agent by the Cardinals.
December 6, 1996: Tom Pagnozzi was signed as a free agent with the St. Louis Cardinals.

Regular season

Season standings

Record vs. opponents

Roster

Transactions
 June 3, 1997: 1997 Major League Baseball draft
Rick Ankiel was drafted by the Cardinals in the 2nd round. Player signed August 28, 1997.
Xavier Nady was drafted by the Cardinals in the 4th round, but did not sign.
José Rodríguez was drafted by the Cardinals in the 24th round. Player signed July 15, 1997.
June 13, 1997: Danny Jackson, Mark Sweeney and Rich Batchelor were traded by the Cardinals to the San Diego Padres for Scott Livingstone, Phil Plantier, and Fernando Valenzuela.
 July 29, 1997: Mike Gallego was released by the Cardinals.

The Trade
The beginning came on July 31, when the Cardinals acquired Mark McGwire from the Oakland Athletics in exchange for relief pitcher T.J. Mathews and minor league pitchers Eric Ludwick and Blake Stein. McGwire could have been a free agent at the end of the season.

McGwire had 34 home runs and 81 RBIs with Oakland at the time of the trade, which reunited him with former Athletics manager Tony La Russa. The Cardinals were considered to  have little chance of keeping him with the club beyond the final two months of the season. But general manager Walt Jocketty's deal figured to inject some excitement into a dull close to the season, since the Cardinals were far out of the race. They had begun their freefall in early July when left fielder Ron Gant had failed to make a routine catch which would have given the Cardinals a victory over the Pittsburgh Pirates. Not only did the Pirates rally for that victory, but they also ended up sweeping the four-game series, knocking the Cardinals out of first place, and sending them reeling.

McGwire hadn't expected to stay with Oakland, but he also didn't think he would end up with the Cardinals.

McGwire's Impact
The team was in the throes of a slump when their new first baseman arrived. On August 10, the Cardinals had lost 11 of their last 14 games. They had scored a total of 58 runs scored in their 21 previous games at that point.

McGwire struggled to hit anything at first but had four home runs with his new team in less than two weeks, including two in an August 13 game that featured a 455-foot dinger, one of the longest in Busch Stadium history.

September Booms
On September 3, the same day pitcher Alan Benes underwent rotate cuff surgery, McGwire hit the first Busch Stadium home run that was measured at more than 500 feet-504 feet, to be exact-hit on a pitch from Jaime Navarro of the Chicago White Sox.

A week later, he hit his 16th homer since joining the Cardinals but his 50th overall for the season, making him only the second man in baseball history-Babe Ruth did it twice-to reach the 50-homer mark in successive seasons

McGwire's biggest blasts might have come on September 17. That afternoon, the Cardinals announced they had signed him to a three-year, $28.5 million contract with an option for a fourth season at $11 million. He announced at the news conference that part of the deal included the formation of a charitable foundation to fight sexual and physical abuse of children, a fight strengthened by his donation of $1 million a year. McGwire choked up and wiped away tears as he talked of that cause, something close to his heart because of a close friend who had suffered such abuse.

He had decided to stay in St. Louis, McGwire said, because of the overwhelming affection shown him by Cardinals fans. Never did he feel it so much as when he stepped to the plate for his first at bat after signing his contract that day. With Los Angeles Dodgers pitcher Ramón Hernández on the mound at Busch, the crowd of 27,157 fans stood for a standing ovation at the announcement of McGwire's name. No one stopped cheering as Martinez threw ball one, then ball two, strike one and ball three. They all remained on their feet and screaming as Martinez fired the fifth pitch of the at bat, which McGwire hit 517 feet for the then-longest home run in stadium history, an upper-deck shot over the left-field scoreboard. it was McGwire's fifth homer of more than 500 feet that season and his 18th home run since joining the Cardinals 48 days earlier.

With two homers on the second-to-last day of the season and one more in the season finale. McGwire ended with 24 homers in the Cardinals uniform and 58 overall for the season. That was a single-season for a right-handed batter and fueled a winter of speculation that he might be the chosen one to break Roger Maris's hallowed record.

Player stats

Batting

Starters by position
Note: Pos = Position; G = Games played; AB = At bats; H = Hits; Avg. = Batting average; HR = Home runs; RBI = Runs batted in

Other batters
Note: G = Games played; AB = At bats; H = Hits; Avg. = Batting average; HR = Home runs; RBI = Runs batted in

Pitching

Starting pitchers
Note: G = Games pitched; IP = Innings pitched; W = Wins; L = Losses; ERA = Earned run average; SO = Strikeouts

Other pitchers
Note: G = Games pitched; IP = Innings pitched; W = Wins; L = Losses; ERA = Earned run average; SO = Strikeouts

Relief pitchers
Note: G = Games pitched; W = Wins; L = Losses; SV = Saves; ERA = Earned run average; SO = Strikeouts

Awards and honors
 St. Louis Baseball Man of the Year: Ray Lankford
Mark McGwire, Major League record, 1st player to lead the Major Leagues in Home Runs but not lead the American League or National League in home runs

Farm system

External links
1997 St. Louis Cardinals at Baseball Reference
1997 St. Louis Cardinals team page at www.baseball-almanac.com

References

St. Louis Cardinals seasons
Saint Louis Cardinals
St Lou